The Radfan Campaign was a series of British military actions during the Aden Emergency in January–May 1964. It took place in the mountainous Radfan region near the border with Yemen. Local tribesmen connected with the NLF began raiding the road connecting with Aden with the town of Dhala.

In January 1964 the local army sent three battalions supported by the RAF to restore order. Trouble flared up again and in April British ground troops were sent in; by May they had taken the main rebel stronghold and the revolt had been suppressed. The NLF then switched its attention to Aden itself.

The first operation in January was known as "Nut cracker". The second one was "Cap Badge".

Edwards patrol
The best known action of the Campaign involved a patrol led by Captain Edwards on the 29 April 1964 which came under the attack. It led to the death of Edwards and another soldier, Sapper John Warburton. They were beheaded and their heads displayed in the Yemeni Capital.

British troops then attacked the area and succeeded in capturing rebel positions, although two more British were killed.

The British went on to use tanks and jets in the fight.

References

External links
Radfan at Britains Small Wars
Aden Emergency at the Argylls Website
Routine Adventure, a 1964 short documentary about Aden at the time of the Radfan Campaign at Colonial Film

Conflicts in 1967
Wars involving the United Kingdom
Aden Emergency
1964 in the Federation of South Arabia